Springfield Center is a hamlet (and census-designated place) in the town of Springfield, Otsego County, New York, United States. According to the 2010 US census, The location of Springfield Center had a population of 402. Springfield Center has a post office with ZIP code 13468, which opened on July 16, 1850.

The Springfield Center Elementary School was listed on the National Register of Historic Places in 2011, the St. Mary's Episcopal Church Complex in 2015, and the Warren Ferris House in 2016.

References

Hamlets in Otsego County, New York
Hamlets in New York (state)